The Keddie murders are an unsolved quadruple homicide which took place over the night of April 1112, 1981, in Keddie, California, United States. The victims were Glenna Susan "Sue" Sharp (née Davis; born March 29, 1945); daughter Tina Louise Sharp (born July 22, 1968); son, John Steven Sharp (born November 16, 1965); and John's friend, Dana Hall Wingate (born February 8, 1964).

The murders took place in house No. 28 of the Keddie Resort. The bodies of Sue, John, and Dana were found on the morning of April 12 by Sue's 14-year-old daughter, Sheila, who had been sleeping at a friend's house. Sue's two younger sons, Rick and Greg, as well as their friend Justin Smartt, were also in the house but were unharmed. Tina was missing from the scene.

Tina remained a missing person until April 1984, when her skull and several other bones were recovered at Camp Eighteen, California, near Feather Falls in Butte County. Multiple leads and suspects were examined in the intervening years, though no charges were filed. Several new leads were announced in the 21st century, including the discovery of a hammer in a pond in 2016, as well as announcements regarding the discovery of new DNA evidence.

Timeline

Background
In July 1979, Glenna Susan "Sue" Sharp (née Davis; born March 29, 1945 in Springfield, Massachusetts), along with her five children, left her home in Connecticut after separating from her husband, James Sharp. She decided to relocate to northern California, where her brother Don was residing at the time. Upon arriving in California, she began renting a small trailer formerly occupied by her brother at the Claremont Trailer Village in Quincy. The following fall, she moved to house #28 in the rural Sierra Nevada railroad town of Keddie. The house was much larger than the trailer, and had become available when Plumas County's then-sheriff, Sylvester Douglas Thomas, moved out. There, she resided with her 15-year-old son, John (born November 16, 1965); 14-year-old daughter Sheila; 12-year-old daughter Tina (born July 22, 1968); and two younger sons, Rick (age 10) and Greg (age 5).

On April 11, 1981, around 11:30 am, Sue, Sheila, and Greg drove from the residence of their friends, the Meeks family, to pick up Rick, who was attending baseball tryouts at Gansner Field in Quincy. Two hours later, around 3:30 pm, John and Dana hitchhiked back to Quincy, where they may have had plans to visit friends. Around this time, the two were seen in the city's downtown area.

That same evening, Tina had plans to spend the night with the Seabolt family, who lived in adjacent #27, while Sue remained at home with Rick, Greg, and the boys' young friend, Justin Smartt. Sheila departed house #28 shortly after 8:00 pm to sleep over at the Seabolts, which she had never before done. Tina, who had been watching television at the Seabolt residence, was told by Sheila that Sue wanted Tina home by 10 PM, so Tina returned to #28 around 9:55 pm.

Murders and discovery
Around 7:00 am on the morning of April 12, Sheila returned to #28 and discovered the dead bodies of Sue, John, and Dana in the house's living room. All three had been bound with medical tape and electrical cords. Tina was absent from the home, while the three younger childrenRick, Greg, and Justinwere found physically unharmed in an adjacent bedroom. Initial reports stated that the three young boys had slept through the incident, though this was later contradicted. Upon discovering the scene, Sheila rushed back to the Seabolts' house, whereupon Jamie Seabolt retrieved Rick, Greg, and Justin through the bedroom window. He later admitted to having briefly entered the home through the back door to see if anyone was still alive, potentially contaminating evidence in the process.

The murders of Sue, John, and Dana were notably vicious: two bloodied knives and one hammer were found at the scene, and one of the knives (a steak knife later determined to have been used in the murders) had been bent at roughly 30 degrees. Blood spatter evidence from inside the house indicated that the murders of Sue, John, and Dana had all taken place in the living room.

Sue was discovered lying on her side near the living room sofa, nude from the waist down and gagged with a blue bandana and her own underwear, which had been secured with tape. She had been stabbed in the chest, her throat was stabbed horizontally, the wound going through her larynx and nicking her spine, and on the side of her head was an imprint matching the butt of a Daisy 880 Powerline BB/pellet rifle. John's throat was slashed. Dana had multiple head injuries and had been manually strangled to death. John and Dana suffered blunt-force trauma to their heads caused by a hammer or hammers. Autopsies determined that Sue and John died from the knife wounds and blunt-force trauma, and Dana died by asphyxiation.

Initial investigation

Sheila and the Seabolt family (with whom Sheila had spent the night in the neighboring home) heard no commotion during the night; a couple living in nearby house #16 was awakened at 1:15 am by what sounded like muffled screaming. Tina's jacket, shoes and a toolbox containing various tools were missing from the house, which showed no indication of forced entry. The house's telephone had been taken off the hook and the cord cut from the outlet, and the drapes were closed.

Martin Smartt, a neighbor and main suspect, claimed that a claw hammer had inexplicably gone missing from his home. Plumas County Sheriff Sylvester Thomas, who presided over the case, later stated that Martin had provided "endless clues" in the case that seemed to "throw the suspicion away from him." In addition to interviewing the Smartts, detectives interviewed numerous other locals and neighbors; several, including members of the Seabolt family, recalled seeing a green van parked at the Sharps' house around 9:00 pm.

Justin gave conflicting stories of the evening, including that he had dreamed details of the murders, though he later claimed to have actually witnessed them. In his later account of events, told under hypnosis, he claimed to have awoken to sounds coming from the living room while asleep in the bedroom with Rick and Greg. Investigating these sounds, he saw Sue with two men: one with a mustache and short hair, the other clean-shaven with long hair; both wore glasses. According to Justin, John and Dana then entered the home and began heatedly arguing with the men. A fight ensued, after which Tina entered the room and was taken out of the cabin's back door by one of the men.

Based on Justin's descriptions, composite sketches of the two unknown men were produced by Harlan Embry, a man with no artistic ability and no training in forensic sketching. It was never explained why, with access to the Justice Department's and the Federal Bureau of Investigation's (FBI) top forensic artists, law enforcement chose to use an amateur who sometimes volunteered to help local police. Both wore gold-framed sunglasses.

Rumors regarding the crimes being ritualistic or motivated by drug trafficking were dismissed by Plumas County Sheriff Doug Thomas, who stated in the week following the murders that no drug paraphernalia or illegal drugs were found in the home. Carla McMullen, a family acquaintance, later told detectives that Dana Wingate had recently stolen an unknown quantity of LSD from local drug dealers, though she was unable to provide proof of this claim. About 4,000 man-hours were spent working the case, which Thomas described as "frustrating".

Recovery of Tina Sharp's remains
Tina's disappearance was initially investigated by the FBI as a possible abduction, though it was reported on April 29, 1981, that the FBI had "backed off" the search as the California State Department of Justice was doing an "adequate job" and "made the FBI's presence unnecessary." A grid pattern search of the area covering a  radius around the house was conducted with police canines, but the efforts were fruitless.

Shortly after announcing the discovery, the Butte County Sheriff's Office received an anonymous call that identified the remains as belonging to Tina, but the call was not documented in the case. A recording of this call was found at the bottom of an evidence box at some point after 2013 by a deputy who was assigned the case. The remains were confirmed by a forensic pathologist to be those of Tina in June 1984. Near the remains, detectives also discovered a blue nylon jacket, a blanket, a pair of Levi Strauss jeans with a missing back pocket, and an empty medical tape dispenser.

Subsequent developments
The house in which the murders occurred was demolished in 2004.

In a 2008 documentary on the murders, Marilyn Smartt claimed that she suspected her husband Martin and his friend John "Bo" Boubede (erroneously reported as "John Boudee" by author Robert Scott) were responsible for the murders. Marilyn claimed that on the evening of April 11, 1981, she had left Martin and Boubede at a local bar around 11:00 pm and returned home to go to sleep. Around 2:00 am on April 12, she stated she awoke to find the two burning an unknown item in the wood stove. Additionally, she alleged that Martin "hated Johnny Sharp with a passion". However, in the 2008 documentary, Sheriff Doug Thomas said he had personally interviewed Martin and that he had passed a polygraph examination.

According to a 2016 article published by The Sacramento Bee, Martin had left Keddie and driven to Reno, Nevada, shortly after the murders; from there, he sent a letter to Marilyn ruminating on personal struggles in their marriage, which he concluded with: "I've paid the price of your love & now I've bought it with four people's lives." In a 2016 interview, Gamberg stated that the letter was "overlooked" in the initial investigation and never admitted as evidence. He later criticized the quality of the initial investigation, saying: "You could take someone just coming out of the academy and they'd have done a better job." A counselor whom Martin regularly visited also alleged that he had admitted to the murders of Sue and Tina, but claimed, "I didn't have anything to do with [the boys]." He allegedly told the counselor that Tina was killed to prevent her from identifying him, as she had "witnessed the whole thing."

Martin Smartt died of cancer in Portland, Oregon, in June 2000. John Boubede, who allegedly had ties to organized crime in Chicago, died there in 1988.

On March 24, 2016, a hammer matching the description of the hammer Martin claimed to have lost was discovered in a local pond and taken into evidence by Plumas County Special Investigator Mike Gamberg. Plumas County Sheriff Hagwood, who was sixteen years old at the time of the murders and knew the Sharp family personally, stated: "the location it was found... It would have been intentionally put there. It would not have been accidentally misplaced." Gamberg also stated that at that time, six potential suspects were being examined.

In April 2018, Gamberg stated that DNA evidence recovered from a piece of tape at the crime scene matched that of a known living suspect.

See also

 List of homicides in California
 List of unsolved murders
 List of solved missing person cases

Notes

References

Sources

External links

1980s missing person cases
1981 in California
1981 murders in the United States
April 1981 events in the United States
Deaths by beating in the United States
Deaths by stabbing in the United States
Deaths by strangulation in the United States
Family murders
Formerly missing people
History of Plumas County, California
Mass murder in 1981
Missing person cases in California
Murdered American children
Murder in California
People murdered in California
Unsolved mass murders in the United States
Violence against children